Marie Mediatrice Izabiliza is a Rwandan politician, currently a member of the Chamber of Deputies in the Parliament of Rwanda.

References 

Members of the Chamber of Deputies (Rwanda)
21st-century Rwandan women politicians
21st-century Rwandan politicians
Living people
Year of birth missing (living people)